Paa-Ko is a census-designated place (CDP) in Bernalillo County, New Mexico, United States, built around the Paa-Ko Ridge Golf Club. It was first listed as a CDP prior to the 2020 census.

The CDP is in northeastern Bernalillo County on the northwest side of New Mexico State Road 14. It is bordered to the southeast, across NM 14, by Edgewood, and to the north it is bordered by La Madera in Sandoval County.

The community is on the west side of the valley of San Pedro Creek, a north-flowing tributary, via Arroyo Tonque, of the Rio Grande.

Demographics

Education
It is zoned to Albuquerque Public Schools.

References 

Census-designated places in Bernalillo County, New Mexico
Census-designated places in New Mexico